Martin Čech (June 2, 1976 in Havlíčkův Brod – September 6, 2007 in Havlíčkův Brod) was a Czech ice hockey defenceman.

Čech played in the Czech Extraliga for HC Zlín and HC Lasselsberger Plzeň before moving to Finland's SM-liiga, spending one season with JYP and two seasons with Pelicans. He then moved to the Russian Super League playing for Metallurg Magnitogorsk, HC Sibir Novosibirsk and Salavat Yulaev Ufa before returning to the Extraliga for HC Moeller Pardubice. He also represented the Czech Republic at international level. Čech was killed in a car crash on September 6, 2007. Despite being deceased, Čech appears in hockey video games: NHL 09, 10, and 11.

References

External links 

1976 births
2007 deaths
Czech ice hockey defencemen
Czech expatriate ice hockey players in Russia
Metallurg Magnitogorsk players
HC Sibir Novosibirsk players
JYP Jyväskylä players
Lahti Pelicans players
Road incident deaths in the Czech Republic
Salavat Yulaev Ufa players
Sportspeople from Havlíčkův Brod
Czech expatriate ice hockey players in Finland